WENZ (107.9 FM) is a commercial mainstream Hip-Hop, R&B radio station licensed to Cleveland, Ohio, serving Greater Cleveland and much of surrounding Northeast Ohio.  Owned by Urban One since 1999, its studios are located along the Euclid Avenue Corridor in Cleveland's eastside, while the station transmitter resides in Russell Township in Geauga County.  Besides a standard analog transmission, WENZ broadcasts over two HD Radio channels, and is available online.

History

Early years
The station debuted on April 5, 1958 as WNOB; it was started by Northern Ohio Broadcasting, whose principals were several people from WNEW in New York. When the companion AM license was not granted, the station found itself in a precarious position, because standalone FM stations in the 1950s did not make money.

In 1961, the station filed for bankruptcy. A machine operator, Phillip Kerwin, purchased WNOB for $16,000. In 1963, WNOB became one of the first FM stations in the US to broadcast in stereo. In 1968, the signal was upgraded; the station purchased a new transmitter and antenna system. Two years later, in 1970, Multicom Inc. (owner of WELW AM 1330 in Willoughby, Ohio) purchased the station for $330,000. The call letters were then changed to WELW-FM. WELW played a top 40 Drake type format for almost two years, then switched to country music.

Disco 108 WDMT/FM 108 WDMT Your Power Station
In 1975, Beasley Broadcast Group purchased the station from Multicom for $550,000, and changed the call letters to WDMT (which is short for "We're DynoMite!", "Dynomite!" being a well-known catchphrase by comic and actor Jimmie "Kid Dynomite" Walker on the popular TV sitcom Good Times). The next year, the station switched to the then-popular Disco format and took the moniker "Disco 108 WDMT." But by 1978, WDMT evolved to a hybrid CHR/UC format also known as "CHUrban" (which would be the forerunner to what is now known as Rhythmic contemporary) as "FM 108 WDMT Your Power Station". WDMT was Cleveland's first-ever CHUrban radio station.

During the WDMT era the station aired "The WDMT's Club Style", where street DJs from Cleveland received opportunities to mix live on the air. Caroline Ford, Freddie James, Steve Szabo, Brenda & Michael Love, Matthew Morgan, Lady Skill, Hot Rod See, with Dean Rufus, and the legendary Ronnie "The Ghoul" Sweed were popular WDMT DJs during this period. In 1985, the entire WDMT air staff appeared with Arsenio Hall on the first 'Urban Music Awards' show.

Power 108 FM

On April 9, 1987, the station changed call letters to WPHR, shifted to a Top 40/CHR format, and rebranded as "Power 108 FM". In 1988, the station was sold to Ardman Broadcasting for $2.8 million. "Power Jocks" during this period included Program Director and DJ Big Steve Kelly, Calvin Hicks, Jimmy Bosh, Maria Farina, Elizabeth "Liz" Luke, John Records Landecker, Gina St. John, Cat Thomas, Rick Michaels, Cathy Cruise, Scotty James, Mark Allen, Edward "Downtown Eddie" Brown, with James "Jammin' Jimmy" Hart, and Sonny Joe Fox among others. WPHR moved its studios to Playhouse Square in late 1988.

107.9 The End

On May 12, 1992, the station changed its callsign to WENZ and flipped its format to alternative rock, branding itself as "107.9 The End". Both the branding and callsign reflected the station's position on the FM dial. In March 1996, Ardman would sell the station to Clear Channel Communications. Both the inception and the demise of The End were stunted: with both format changes, the station broadcast a 24-hour loop of R.E.M.'s song "It's the End of the World as We Know It (And I Feel Fine)".  A documentary film made about The End, entitled The End of the World As We Knew It, was released in 2009 and featured many of the former staffers and jocks. On February 25, 2020, "The End" was re-launched as an internet radio station under the management of former station producer, Dan Binder.

Z 107.9
As part of divestitures required by federal agencies to approve Clear Channel's purchase of Jacor, WENZ was purchased by Radio One on January 15, 1999. Radio One's station portfolio and programming philosophy targeted African American communities. As a result, WENZ dropped their modern rock format for mainstream urban featuring hip-hop and R&B on May 14, 1999, taking the "KISS 107.9" brand. One week later, Lorain–licensed WZLE, itself now under Clear Channel ownership, switched formats from Contemporary Christian to CHR as "Kiss 104.9", then filed a cease and desist order against Radio One for usage of the "KISS-FM" brand, which Clear Channel claimed ownership of in the state of Ohio. WENZ rebranded to "Z 107.9" on September 1, 1999, resolving the dispute. Radio One was renamed Urban One in May 2018.

Current programming
WENZ is the Cleveland affiliate of the nationally syndicated Morning Hustle with HeadKrack (via Syndication One).  The rest of the day features local programs  - including The Micah Dixon Show middays, The Day Party with Ro Digga and DJ Ryan Wolf afternoons, and Urban One syndicated Posted On The Corner with Incognito evenings.

References

External links

Cleveland Broadcast Radio Archives: WENZ timeline
107.9 The End: Internet Radio Station

1958 establishments in Ohio
African-American history in Cleveland
Mainstream urban radio stations in the United States
Urban One stations
Radio stations established in 1958
ENZ